Valromey-sur-Séran is a commune in the Ain department in eastern France. The municipality was established on 1 January 2019 by merger of the former communes of Belmont-Luthézieu, Lompnieu, Sutrieu and Vieu.

Geography

Climate

Valromey-sur-Séran has a oceanic climate (Köppen climate classification Cfb).

See also
Communes of the Ain department

References

Communes of Ain

Communes nouvelles of Ain
Populated places established in 2019
2019 establishments in France